The Society of Book and Snake (incorporated as the Stone Trust Corporation) is the fourth oldest secret society at Yale University and was the first society to induct women into its delegation. Book and Snake was founded at the Sheffield Scientific School in 1863 as a three-year society bearing the Greek letters Sigma Delta Chi. As other "Sheff" societies, it was once residential and maintained a separate residential "cloister" at 1 Hillhouse Ave, which was built in 1888 and deeded to Yale after the institution of the residential college system. Members who lived in the society residence, or "Cloister," become the Cloister Club. Today, the building is the Yale University Provost's Office. A plaque honoring the society can be found on the first floor of the building. The Book and Snake emblem is a book surrounded by the ouroboros.

Like other landed Yale societies, Book and Snake owns its own meeting hall, or "tomb" at the corner of Grove St. and High St. As is tradition with the meeting places of Yale secret societies, the building is windowless and is usually available only to the current members and alumni. The society hosts invite-only parties for other members of the senior class to attend.

Architects of the Book & Snake Buildings 
The Book and Snake Tomb stands at the corner of Grove St. and High St. in New Haven, CT, adjacent to the Yale Law School and the Beinecke Plaza. It was designed by Louis R. Metcalfe (1901), in Greek Ionic style. The front door is modeled after the Erechtheion Temple on the Acropolis in Athens. Passersby will notice wrought-iron snakes, or "caduceuses" adorning the iron fence surrounding the property. The white marble temple, startling in its Classical Greek verisimilitude, is deliberately situated with its back to the Yale campus; instead its orientation facing directly across the street to the massive Egyptian-revival gates of the Grove Street Cemetery, makes for an impressive display of ancient, mortuary-themed solemnity. Four Ionic pillars, also of marble, shield the bronze doors. (Citation at ).

The former meeting place of Book and Snake was a residential hall of the Sheffield Scientific School known as the "Cloister". H. Edwards Ficken designed the building (1888). Today, the "Cloister" serves as the Yale University Provost's Office at 1 Hillhouse Ave.

Notable members
 Bill Nelson, National Aeronautics and Space Administration (NASA) Administrator (nominated by President Biden), former United States Senator from Florida

 Bob Woodward, journalist, The Washington Post
 Henry Louis "Skip" Gates Jr, literary critic, Harvard professor
 Porter J. Goss, former Director of the Central Intelligence Agency, U.S. Congressman
John Campbell Greenway, General, U.S. Army, Mining Executive, husband of Isabella Greenway
 Les Aspin, former Secretary of Defense
 Nicholas F. Brady, former Secretary of the Treasury
 John Vernou Bouvier III, Father of former First Lady Jacqueline Kennedy Onassis
 Charles Rivkin, former U.S. Assistant Secretary of State for Economic and Business Affairs
 Reed Hundt, former Chief Commissioner, Federal Communications Commission
 Sheila Ford Hamp, owner of the Detroit Lions
 William T. Bull, college football coach and physician
 Cinco Paul, Screenwriter

See also
 Collegiate secret societies in North America
 Skull and Bones Society
 Scroll and Key Society
 Wolf's Head Society
 Manuscript Society
 Berzelius Society
 Aurelian Honor Society
 Brothers in Unity
 Myth and Sword

External links 
 Information on Book and Snake provided Kris Millegan
 Behind the walls of Yale's secret societies
 An Irrepressible Urge to Join
 Guide to the Stone Trust Corporation, Yale University, Records RU 856
 YALE'S EXTRACURRICULAR & SOCIAL ORGANIZATIONS 1780 - 1960

References

1863 establishments in Connecticut
Secret societies at Yale
Student organizations established in 1863